Wynne Paris (born June 22, 1964, in Redstone Arsenal, Alabama) was a new-age and world beat musician/producer with a special focus on yoga music and kirtan, the call-and-response singing of Bhakti yoga. His live performance combines Kirtan chanting, American music (jazz, gospel music, blues and rock music), world beat rhythms and raga scales. He sings in both English and Sanskrit. Paris plays a variety of musical instruments which include the guitar, sarod (a 26 stringed, sitar-like instrument from India), harmonium, saz (a stringed instrument in the lute family) and percussion. Wynne Paris died suddenly of a heart attack on March 22, 2021.

Career
Paris began  his career as a musician in the 1980s as a rock & roll and rhythm & blues guitar artist, performing with artists like Rusted Root's Jim Donovan, and Mark Karan of the rock band RatDog. In 1994, Wynne took up Indian music and yoga, changing the direction of his music. In 1996, one of the songs he co-wrote with Maura Moynihan, "Prayer for the Pure Land", won first place in the Songwriters' Association of Washington National Songwriting Contest. Also in that year, he met the Indian "hugging saint" Mata Amritanandamayi, known to her devotees as Ammachi or Amma, which inspired him to move to Marin County to study Indian music, shamanism, and yoga.

Since 1998, Paris has primarily performed and recorded New Age and World Beat music with an Indian influence, performing kirtan chanting and playing both Western and traditional Indian musical instruments. He appeared on the first album of Krishna Das, Pilgrim Heart (1998), who is known for popularising kirtan music in the West. This album also featured Sting.

Paris released his debut album, Ghandarva Café in 2004, which was followed by Emptiness and Ecstasy (2005) and Omspun, featuring Groovananda, in (2009).

Over the years, Paris has recorded with many notable musicians in these genres including Krishna Das, Badal Roy (Miles Davis), Shahin and Sepehr, Sharon Gannon, Bhagavan Das, David Newman, Wade Morissette, Rick Allen, Guru Ganesha Singh Khalsa, Mark Karan (Bob Weir & RatDog), Perry Robinson, Hans Christian, Dave Stringer, and Girish.

Paris played for a "Yoga Ball" celebrating President Barack Obama's second inauguration at St. Francis Hall in Northeast Washington, D.C. on  January 22, 2013.

Groovananda
Paris is the creative director of Groovananda (which means "the bliss of the groove"), a collective of musicians formed in 2005 the core consisting of Paris, Rick Allen (Def Leppard) and John "JT" Thomas (Bruce Hornsby Band), who play rock-and-jazz-influenced kirtan. On May 14, 2010, he and Groovananda were part of a benefit in Washington, D.C. for the Bonobo Conservation Initiative. They have produced a single, Tara Om, with Krishna Das, and one CD, Omspun, released in 2011, both by Auspician Records. Besides the core band members, it featured Badal Roy, Perry Robinson, Mark Karan, Hans Christian, John Wubbenhorst and several others, and vocalists including Krishna Das and Dave Stringer.

Lovelight Yoga & Arts Festival 
For the first time in 2016, Lovelight Yoga & Arts Festival brought together multiple communities for a celebration of yoga, kirtan, flow arts, meditation, learning, and healing.

Woodstock Music & Art Fair producer Michael Lang, musician Wynne Paris, and Kimberley Maddox co-produced the event, which brought dozens of musicians and accomplished yoga instructors from across the country to share their practice and knowledge with attendees of all ages.

The festival was held at Camp Ramblewood, located in proximity to Darlington, Maryland.

A second installment of this annual event was scheduled to take place on August 18–21, 2017.

Performance venues

 Constitution Hall in Washington, DC
 National Zoo - Smithsonian music series
 Millennium Celebration in Washington, DC
 Willow Tree Yoga Center in Washington, DC 
 (CBGB's) CB's Gallery in New York City
 Health and Harmony Festival in Sonoma, California
 Karmapalooza Yoga Festival in Miami, Florida
 Starwood Festival in Pomeroy, Ohio
 Taos Yoga Center in Taos, New Mexico
 Holy Cow Yoga Center in Charleston, South Carolina
 Three Rivers Yoga Studio in Pittsburgh, Pennsylvania
 Elysian Fields Yoga in Saint Simons Island, Georgia 
 Omkar Ashram in Colorado

With Krishna Das

 The Omega Institute in Rhinebeck, New York
 The Jivamukti Yoga Center in New York City, NY 
 Yogaville - The Satchidananda Ashram in Buckingham, Virginia
 ChantLanta Sacred Music Festival in Atlanta, Georgia

Discography
 Inner and Outer Space - Caroline Casey (1996) Sounds True
 Playful Yoga: Movement & Meditation for All Ages - Various Artists (1998) White Swan Records
 Pilgrim Heart – Krishna Das (1998) Triloka/Mercury Records
 Drum Prayer - Steve Gordon (2002) Sequoia Records
 Planet Yoga – Krishna Das (composed music for single "Prayer to Rudra") (2002) Karuna
 Japa - Dave Stringer (Aug 08, 2002) Ajna Music
 Nostalgia - Shahin and Sepehr (2002) Higher Octave
 Chakra Healing Chants - Sophia Songhealer (Feb 04, 2003) Sequoia Records
 Ghandarva Café - Wynne Paris (March 2, 2004)
 Jai Ma: White Swan Yoga Masters, Vol. 2 CD - Various Artists (2004) White Swan Records
 Emptiness and Ecstasy - Wynne Paris (January 25, 2005) Auspician CD
 Yoga Salon - Various Artists (April 12, 2005) Sequoia Records
 All One – Krishna Das (Aug 23, 2005) Triloka
 Oshun and Gaia - Amikaeyla Proudfoot Gaston & Ariana Lightningstorm (with Kiva) (2006) Amikaeyla and Ariana
 Arcana - Lisa Reagan (2006) Stillpoint Records
 Pure Ganesh - Guru Ganesha Singh (2007) Spirit Voyage
 The Journey Home - Gurunam Singh (February 29, 2008) (Played and Composed) Spirit Voyage
 Bhagavan Kripa: A Kirtan of Grace - Jojo and Yati Priya (Mar. 25th, 2008) Devotional Music Foundation
 Tara Om - Wynne Paris & Groovananda with Krishna Das (single) (April 1, 2008) Auspician
 Infinita - Lawson Rollins, (May 20, 2008) Infinita
 Maha Moha: The Great Delusion - Wade Imre Morissette (Sep. 16, 2008) Notone	
 Love, Peace, Chant - David Newman (September 30, 2008) Nettwerk Records
 Get Free - Devi (Oct. 17, 2008) True Nature
 Kundalini Meditation Music - Various Artists (September 22, 2009) Sounds True
 Head Over Heels - Mahbood Len Seligman (2010)
 Let Your Heart Be Known - Steve Gold (July 2011) Steve Gold Music
 Omspun - Wynne Paris & Groovananda (July 19, 2011) Auspician Records CD
 Ghandarva Café: Ecstatic Songs of Love & Devotion - Wynne Paris (Import CD) EMI (August 16, 2011)
 Change - Gurunam Singh (Jun 12, 2012) Spirit Voyage Music
 Heaven is Dancing – SuperTrine (single) (June 25, 2013) Auspician Records

References

Further reading
 Five for the Ride: Car Kirtan (Use with Caution) by Brenda Patoine (February 7, 2012) in The Bhakti Beat
  Finding Community Through Chant Jan 8th, 2013 Washington Post Photo by Susan Biddle of Wynne Paris Kirtan performance at Lil Omm Yoga in the District
 Purely by Chants: Wynne Paris Helps Bring the Ancient Art of Kirtan into the 21st Century by Arvid Smith in Folio Weekly

External links
 Wynne Paris, website
 

1964 births
Living people
American male singer-songwriters
Harmonium players
Sarod players
People from Madison County, Alabama
Bhajan singers
Record producers from Alabama
American new-age musicians
New-age composers
New-age guitarists
Guitarists from Alabama
20th-century American guitarists
American male guitarists
20th-century American male musicians
Singer-songwriters from Alabama